

Current Israeli Ambassadors 
Updated  November 25, 2022

Ambassadors to International Organizations 
Current ambassadors from Israel to international organizations

Consuls General 
Updated April 23, 2020
Current consuls general from Israel:

Other Senior Diplomatic Representatives
Other senior diplomatic representatives from Israel

Current and Past Ambassadors
Well-known current and past ambassadors from Israel

See also
List of Israeli ambassadors to the United States
Israel-Venezuela relations
List of Israeli ambassadors to the United Nations

Notes

External links 
 Websites of Israeli Embassies and Consulates